Diogo Piçarra (born 19 October 1990) is a Portuguese singer. He won the fifth season of the Portuguese version of Pop Idol in 2012.

Biography
Diogo Piçarra was born in Faro. As a 17-year-old, he formed the band "Fora da Bóia". While studying at the University of Algarve, he took a semester abroad to pursue his studies at Palacký University in the Czech Republic.

In 2009, Piçarra competed on season three of Ídolos, Portugal's version of Pop Idol. He got to the piano phase of the competition and was eliminated. In 2010, he participated in the music TV contest Operação Triunfo, but did not get through to the first round. In 2012, he tried for the third time and won season five of Ídolos. As a prize, he won a car and a scholarship to a music course in London.

He released his first album, Espelho, in March 2015, which debuted at number one on the Portuguese music charts. In the end of March 2017, he released his second album, do=s, collaborating with artists such as Valas on "Ponto de Partida" and April Ivy on "Não Sou Eu".

In 2017, he tattooed the face of the late Chester Bennington from Linkin Park on his leg to pay homage to him, stating that this was one of his childhood heroes.

In January 2018, it was announced that Piçarra would participate in Festival da Canção 2018, singing a song that he composed, called "Canção do Fim". This was his first attempt at this competition, which allows the winner to participate in Eurovision Song Contest 2018 in Lisbon. Days before the Grand Final of Festival da Canção 2018, and after winning the second semi-final with the maximum score, he decided to leave the competition, due to accusations that he had plagiarised "Open Your Eyes", a 1976 song performed by the Maranatha Singers.

In 2019, it was announced Diogo would be a coach on The Voice Portugal  alongside Aurea, Marisa Liz & Antonio Zambujo.

Discography

Albums

Singles

As lead artist

As featured artist

References

Living people
1990 births
21st-century Portuguese male singers
Idols (TV series) winners
Portuguese male singer-songwriters
Portuguese pop singers
People from Faro, Portugal
University of Algarve alumni